Kleszczewko  is a village in the administrative district of Gmina Pszczółki, within Gdańsk County, Pomeranian Voivodeship, in northern Poland.

For details of the history of the region, see History of Pomerania.

The village has a population of 268.

References

Kleszczewko